The 56th Arizona State Legislature, consisting of the Arizona Senate and the Arizona House of Representatives, is the current legislative session constituted in Phoenix on January 9, 2023, during the first two years of Katie Hobbs's first full term in office. Both the Senate and the House membership remained constant at 30 and 60, respectively. In the November 2022 Senate election, Republicans maintained an unchanged 16–14 majority. Republicans also maintained an unchanged 31–29 majority in the House after the November 2022 House election.

Sessions
The Legislature met in its first regular session at the State Capitol in Phoenix. The session opened on January 9, 2023.

The second regular session will begin on January 8, 2024.

Senate

Members

The asterisk (*) denotes members of the previous Legislature who continued in office as members of this Legislature.

House of Representatives

Members 
The asterisk (*) denotes members of the previous Legislature who continued in office as members of this Legislature.

References

Arizona legislative sessions
2023 in Arizona
Arizona